The General Health Insurance Company (Všeobecná zdravotná poisťovňa), is the largest health insurance company in Slovakia, with branches in most districts. As of 1 January 2018, it insures approximately 62% of the population of Slovakia. It was established in 1995 from the National Insurance Company. On 1 July 2005, it was transformed into a joint-stock company with 100% state participation administered by the Ministry of Health. As of 1 January 2010, it was merged with the Joint Health Insurance Company.

History
The General Health Insurance Company (VSZP) was established in Slovakia on 1 July 1998 by merging the three previous health insurance companies: The Railway Health Insurance Company 
(Železničná zdravotná poisťovňa), Insurance Company of the Ministry of the Interior of the Slovak Republic
(Poisťovňa Ministerstva vnútra SR), and the Military Health Insurance Company (Vojenská zdravotná poisťovňa).

The spokesperson of the company was Martina Ostatníková, a well known singer. 

The company expired on 31 December 2009 through a merger with the Joint Health Insurance Company.

References

Medical and health organisations based in Slovakia